is a bus terminal at Ina, Nagano, Japan. The bus terminal is used by the JR Bus and Ina Bus. The terminal is located near Takatō Castle.

Two bus routes are operated by JR Bus Kanto; Bound to Chino Station, Inashi Station and Inakita Station. Besides, Ina, Nagano's operation of 5 bus routes around Takato B.T. are entrusted to JR Bus Kanto.

Facilities

A store sells tickets and commuter coupons and operates an information desk. The store sells connecting tickets for the highway bus and various commuting tickets, along with books of coupon tickets.

Routes
The IC card is not accepted on all bus routes. Passengers who have Japan Rail Pass are able to ride on the following bus routes without an additional fee.

Community Buses
IC card is not accepted on buses.

References

Park which is held the Cherry Blossom Festival in April around Takato Castle

External links

 Official website

Bus stations in Japan
Transport in Nagano Prefecture
Buildings and structures in Nagano Prefecture
Ina, Nagano